The Dark Sides is a compilation of King Diamond songs, released in 1988 by Roadrunner Records. This album contains five tracks (and an outro), released on previous albums, but are mostly unrelated in their stories (as King's albums were concept albums).

Controversy
The album cover featured King Diamond with face paint that resembled KISS bassist Gene Simmons' "Demon". Simmons claimed that King's face paint was copyright infringement and sued him. The lawsuit was eventually dropped when King changed his design.

Track listing
 "Halloween" – 4:14 (previously released on Fatal Portrait)
 "Them" – 1:58 (instrumental track, previously released on Them)
 "No Presents for Christmas" – 4:21 (previously released as the A-side of No Presents for Christmas single; later as a bonus track on the 2007 remastered version of Fatal Portrait)
 "Shrine" – 4:23 (previously released as the b-side of The Family Ghost single; later as a bonus track on the 2007 remastered version of Abigail)
 "The Lake" – 4:13 (previously released as a b-side of Halloween single and as a bonus track on CD versions of Fatal Portrait)
 "Phone Call" – 1:38 (previously released on CD versions of Them)

Credits
King Diamond – all vocals
Andy LaRocque – guitars
Michael Denner – guitars
Pete Blakk – guitars
Timi Hansen – bass
Hal Patino – bass
Mikkey Dee – drums

References

King Diamond albums
1988 EPs